Pattiswick is a village near the A120 road, and former civil parish, now in the parish of Bradwell, in the Braintree district, in the county of Essex, England. In 1931 the parish had a population of 297. On 1 April 1949 the parish was abolished and merged with Bradwell, part also went to Coggeshall.

References 

Villages in Essex
Former civil parishes in Essex
Braintree District